Emily Chamlee-Wright (born July 7, 1966) is an American economist who serves as president and CEO of the Institute for Humane Studies. From 2012 through 2016, she was the Provost and Dean of Washington College. She taught economics at Beloit College from 1993 to 2012, where she held the Elbert H. Neese Jr. Professorship in Economics and served as associate dean from 2010 to 2012. She was one of three principal investigators with the Mercatus Center researching Gulf Coast recovery efforts in the aftermath of Hurricane Katrina.

Bibliography
 The Cultural Foundations of Economic Development: Urban Female Entrepreneurship in Ghana (Routledge 1997)
 Culture and Enterprise: The Development, Representation and Morality of Business (with Don Lavoie, Routledge 2000)
 The Cultural and Political Economy of Recovery: Social Learning in a Post-disaster Environment (Routledge 2010)
 Political Economy of Hurricane Katrina and Community Rebound (with Virgil Storr, Edward Elgar 2010)
 How We Came Back (with Nona Martin Storr and Virgil Storr, Mercatus Center 2015)
 Liberal Learning and the Art of Self-Governance (editor, Routledge 2015)

References

External links
 Chamlee-Wright profile at the Institute for Humane Studies
 Chamlee-Wright profile at the Mercatus Center

American women economists
George Mason University alumni
Washington College people
Beloit College faculty
Living people
20th-century American economists
21st-century American economists
American women chief executives
1966 births
Mercatus Center
American university and college faculty deans
Women deans (academic)
20th-century American women
21st-century American women